Anthony Fry may refer to:

Anthony Fry (artist)
Anthony Fry (business executive)